Carrozzeria Italiana Cesare Sala was a Milan-based coachbuilder. They provided carriages for the Vienna court and bodies for Isotta Fraschini automobiles.

Coachbuilders of Italy
Manufacturing companies based in Milan